Crisis is a 1972 Australian TV movie produced by Robert Bruning and directed by Bill Hughes.

Cast
Helen Morse
Neva Carr-Glynn
Queenie Ashton
Diane Craig
Sandy Harbutt

References

External links

Crisis at AustLit (subscription required)

Australian drama television films
1972 television films
1972 films
1972 drama films
1970s English-language films